Bowellism is a modern architectural style heavily associated with Richard Rogers. It is described as a transient architectural and flippant style that was influenced by Le Corbusier and Antoni Gaudi. The style consists of services for the building, such as ducts, sewage pipes, and lifts, being located on the exterior to maximise space in the interior.

Origin
The style originated with Michael Webb's 1957 student project for a Furniture Manufacturers Association building in High Wycombe. Webb coined the term in response to a comment on his design by Sir Nikolaus Pevsner in a 1961 lecture, in which he recalled hearing the words: "within the schools there are some disturbing trends; I saw the other day a design for a building that looked like a series of stomachs sitting on a plate. Or bowels, connected by bits of gristle". Thus this inside-out style was termed 'Bowellism' because of how it recalled the way the human body works. One of Webb's proposed structures based on bowellism was the Sin Centre for Leicester Square. The concept was a geodesic structure that supports a glass skin.

Some scholars cite Reyner Banham as the first to use bowellism for the new architectural fascination with visible circulation, one that focuses on a building's skeletal services as well as its "bloodstream" or the moving cars and crowd, cascading down from the top to the main foyers - all visible through the structure's geodesic skin. Banham is also credited for introducing the term "topological" to refer to an aspect of brutalism.

Richard Rogers and Renzo Piano continued the style with the design of the Pompidou Centre in Paris, described as a "vast exercise in Bowellism", so the floor space of the interior could be maximised to fully appreciate the exhibitions.

Examples
 The Pompidou Centre in Paris (1977) by Rogers and Renzo Piano. 
 The Lloyd's building in London (1978) also by Rogers.
 The Central Library of Rotterdam (1983) by Jaap Bakema.
 The Channel 4 headquarters, 124 Horseferry Road, London.

Gallery

See also

 High-tech architecture
 British high-tech architecture

References

Architectural styles
20th-century architectural styles